Shahrak-e Emam may refer to:
 Shahrak-e Emam, Mohr, Fars Province
 Shahrak-e Emam, Neyriz, Fars Province
 Shahrak-e Emam, Qir and Karzin, Fars Province
 Shahrak-e Emam, Ilam
 Shahrak-e Emam, Khuzestan
 Shahrak-e Emam, Razavi Khorasan

See also
 Shahrak-e Emam Khomeyni (disambiguation)